The following highways are numbered 415:

Canada
 Manitoba Provincial Road 415
 New Brunswick Route 415
 Newfoundland and Labrador Route 415

Costa Rica
 National Route 415

India
 National Highway 415 (India)

Japan
 Japan National Route 415

United States
  Interstate 415 (former)
 Florida:
  Florida State Road 415
  County Road 415 (Volusia County, Florida)
 Florida State Road 415A (former)
  County Road 415 (Seminole County, Florida)
  Georgia State Route 415 (unsigned designation for Interstate 520)
  Iowa Highway 415
  Louisiana Highway 415
 Louisiana Highway 415 Spur
  Maryland Route 415
 New York:
  New York State Route 415
 County Route 415 (Steuben County, New York) (former)
 New York State 415 (former)
  Pennsylvania Route 415
  Puerto Rico Highway 415
  Virginia State Route 415